Bhavani Prasad Bhattacharyya   (23 August 1914 – 3 February 1935) was an Indian revolutionary and member of the Bengal Volunteers who carried out assassinations against British colonial officials in an attempt to  secure Indian independence.

Family 
Bhavani prasad Bhattacharyya was born in Joydevpur Dhaka in 1914. His father was Basanta Kumar Bhattacharyya and mother, Damayanti Devi. He joined the Bengal Volunteers, a revolutionary organisation of British India at an early age.

Revolutionary activities

Assassination attempt of John Anderson 
Bhabani Prasad Bhattacharya, travelled to Darjeeling with Ujjwala Majumdar, Sukumar Ghosh, Ravi Banerjee, and some other revolutionary activists to assassinate Governor John Anderson; he hid his weapon in a harmonium carried by Ujjwala Majumder. Ujjwala entered a hotel and posed as a married couple with Manoranjan Banerjee. On May 6, 1934, Bhavani Prasad Bhattacharya shot the governor at the Darjeeling Lebong Racecourse, but only inflicted minor injuries. He was caught and later hanged. Ujjwala Majumdar and Manoranjan Banerjee fled to Calcutta in disguise and took refuge in Sovarani Dutt's house. Police arrested them on May 18, 1934. Sukumar Ghosh and Ujjwala Majumder was sentenced to 14 years in prison and Bhabani Prasad was sentenced to death for expressing regret.

Death
He was hanged in Rajshahi Central Jail on February 3, 1935. After independence, there were demands from various quarters to change the name of the house. With that in mind, Anderson House was renamed Bhabani Bhaban in 1989. It is now the headquarters of the State Police of the Government of West Bengal.

References

1914 births
1935 deaths
Indian independence activists from Bengal
Revolutionary movement for Indian independence
Indian nationalism
Indian people convicted of murder
Indian revolutionaries
Executed revolutionaries
Executed Indian people
20th-century executions by the United Kingdom
People executed by British India by hanging